Timpson is a surname, meaning son of Timothy. Notable people with the surname include:

Alex Timpson (1946–2016), was a British campaigner for children's rights
Alma A. Timpson, (1905–1997) a leader in the Mormon fundamentalist movement
Annis May Timpson, academic specialising in Canadian Studies
Ant Timpson (born 1966), New Zealand film producer
Edward Timpson (born 1973), British politician
John Timpson (1928–2005), British journalist and broadcaster
John Timpson (businessman) (born 1943), British businessman
Michael Timpson (born 1967), American football player
Michael Sidney Timpson (born 1970), American composer
Tyrell Timpson (born 1986), an American professional basketball player
William E. Jessop (born William E. Timpson), a leader in the Mormon fundamentalist movement and son of Alma A. Timpson

Patronymic surnames